Flexor longus muscle may refer to:

 Flexor digitorum longus muscle
 Flexor hallucis longus muscle
 Flexor pollicis longus muscle